The Mannahatta Project is a Wildlife Conservation Society research project in historical ecology led by landscape ecologist Eric W. Sanderson that principally ran for 10 years, from 1999-2009, reconstructing the island at the point of first contact between the Dutch ship Halve Maen and the Lenape in 1609. The work culminated in the publication of Mannahatta: A Natural History of New York City in 2009, and has subsequently developed as the Welikia Project and in influence on other environmental initiatives.

Project and book 
The project has explored the great biodiversity and ecological complexity through a historical geographic information system based on georeferencing of the British Headquarters Map of 1782 and the Randel Farm Maps made for the Commissioners' Plan of 1811, while also detailing the formative impact of Native American use of fire in ecosystems. It culminated in 2009 for the 400th anniversary with the publication of the book Mannahatta: A Natural History of New York City, which also includes a speculative look forward to the effect of climate change on New York City and hopeful human adaptations in the year 2409. An exhibition at the Museum of the City of New York was held the same year.

Sanderson estimates that in 1609 the landmass of the land now called Manhattan contained 66 miles of rivers and streams, numerous fishable tidal inlets, 70 kinds of trees, "627 species of plants, 85 species of fish, 32 species of reptiles and amphibians, 233 species of birds and 24 species of mammals." Additionally, Sanderson describes the 1609 landscape as one tended to by the Lenape peoples with geological evidence suggesting the indigenous peoples leveled forests and fields of grasslands, potentially engaged in small scale farming.

Later phase and influence 
A follow-up project for 3 years was the Welikia Project ("my good home" in Lenape), examining the whole geography of New York City, which ran from 2010-2013. A planned sequel book is tentatively titled The Welikia Atlas: A Natural History of New York’s Five Boroughs.

The 2007 book The World Without Us includes a chapter "The City Without Us", inspired by the Mannahatta Project, that imagines a future depopulated New York City. 

As a benchmark in environmental history, the Mannahatta Project has influenced restoration ecology initiatives in the region. The Billion Oyster Project aims to restore the estuary to its state in 1609.

References

1600s in the environment
2009 non-fiction books
Books about New York City
Environment of New York City
History of Manhattan
Lenape
Maps of New York City
Wildlife Conservation Society
Landscape ecology
Natural history books
Natural history of New York (state)
Research projects
Environmental history